The Boxer Indemnity Scholarship by the United Kingdom ( or simply ) was a scholarship program for Chinese students to be educated in the United Kingdom, funded by the remittent of  of China to the United Kingdom. It was established after the United States' Boxer Indemnity Scholarship.

History
Unlike the U.S., the remittent of the indemnity caused a debate in the parliament of the United Kingdom, on the allocation of the money, on education or on other area such as railways.

Recipients

References

Boxer Indemnity Scholarship recipients
Academic transfer
Boxer Rebellion
China–United Kingdom relations
Education in China
Scholarships in China
Scholarships in the United Kingdom
Student politics in China